Michael Regin is an Indian professional footballer who plays as a defensive midfielder.

Career
Regin has played for Chennai City in the Chennai Super Division and the I-League. He made his professional debut for the club in the league on 14 January 2017 against Bengaluru FC. He came on as a 55th-minute substitute for Marcos Thank as Chennai City lost 2–0.

He also represented Railways in the Santosh Trophy.

Personal life
He is the elder brother of Michael Soosairaj, who plays as an attacking midfielder for ATK Mohun Bagan.

Career statistics

Honours

Club
Chennai City FC
I-League: 2018–19
ATK
Indian Super League: 2019–20

References

Living people
Indian footballers
Chennai City FC players
Association football midfielders
I-League players
1988 births